The title of "Oil Capital of the World" is often used to refer to Tulsa, Oklahoma.  Houston, Texas, the current center of the oil industry, more frequently uses the sobriquet “The Energy Capital of the World.”

History

In mid-19th century, when Pennsylvania was the first center of petroleum production, Pittsburgh and Titusville were considered oil capitals.  In the later 19th century, before oil was discovered in Texas, Oklahoma, or the Middle East, Cleveland, Ohio had a claim to the title, with 86 or 88 refineries operating in the city in 1884.

Tulsa claimed the name early in the 20th century, after oil strikes at Red Fork (1901) and Glenpool (1905) in Tulsa County.  Many prominent oilmen lived in Tulsa at some point, including Josh Cosden, William Skelly, Harry Ford Sinclair, Waite Phillips, Thomas Gilcrease, George Kaiser, and J. Paul Getty.  Many corporations producing, refining or transporting petroleum had at some point their headquarters or major facilities in Tulsa including Texaco, BP-Amoco, Cities Service Company, Sinclair Oil and Gas Company, Skelly Oil Company, Warren Petroleum Company, the Williams Companies, and Kaiser-Francis Oil Company.  In 1923 a group of Tulsa oilmen organized the first International Petroleum Exposition and Congress (IPE); among the IPE's stated purposes was to "firmly establish Tulsa for all time to come as the oil center of the entire world."

Tulsa continued to be known and promote itself as the "oil capital of the world" into the 1950s and 1960s. The IPE grew and reached its peak attendance in 1966, when the Golden Driller, a large statue symbolic of Tulsa's historical importance in the oil industry, was erected in front of the new IPE Building, then said to be the world's largest building under one roof.  By the 1970s, however, the IPE's success, and Tulsa's role in the international oil industry, had both eroded: Tulsa's last IPE was held in 1979, while Houston has become the most prominent hub of the oil industry in the United States. In more recent times, Tulsa's continued use of "oil capital of the world" is often characterized as nostalgic or historical.  But even today, energy is one of Tulsa's major industries, and many of the city's professional sports franchises have petroleum-related names such as the Tulsa Oilers (ice hockey), the Tulsa Drillers (baseball), and the Tulsa Roughnecks (now FC Tulsa, men's soccer).

National Register of Historic Places designation

In 2010, Tulsa officially designated the central part of its downtown as the "Oil Capital Historic District" for the purposes of a proposed registration in the National Register of Historic Places. It was officially listed on December 13, 2010, under Criterion A for significance in Commerce. Its NRIS number is 10001013.

References

External links
 Oklahoma Digital Maps: Digital Collections of Oklahoma and Indian Territory
U. S. Department of the Interior, National Register of Historic Places registration form, "Oil Capital Historic District."

Culture of Houston
Culture of Tulsa, Oklahoma
City nicknames